The 2016 Federation Tournament of Champions took place at the Times Union Center in downtown Albany on March 18, 19 and 20. Federation championships were awarded in the AA, A and B classifications. Thomas Jefferson Campus in Brooklyn won the Class AA championship. Shamorie Ponds of Thomas Jefferson Campus was named the Class AA tournament's Most Valuable Player.

Class AA 

Participating teams, results and individual honors in Class AA were as follows:

Participating teams

Results 

Thomas Jefferson Campus finished the season with a 25-9 record.

Individual honors 

The following players were awarded individual honors for their performances at the Federation Tournament:

Most Valuable Player 

 Shamorie Ponds, Thomas Jefferson Campus

All-Tournament Team 

 Rasheem Dunn, Thomas Jefferson Campus
 Devonte Green, Long Island Lutheran
 Jalen Pickett, Aquinas Institute
 Curtis Smith, Thomas Jefferson Campus
 Nyontay Wisseh, Xaverian

Sportsmanship Award 

 Earnest Edwards, Aquinas Institute

Class A 

Participating teams, results and individual honors in Class A were as follows:

Participating teams

Results 

Albany Academy finished the season with an 18-4 record.

Individual honors 

The following players were awarded individual honors for their performances at the Federation Tournament:

Most Valuable Player 

 Hameir Wright, Albany Academy

All-Tournament Team 

 Sal Arena, Albany Academy
 Devin Ballour, Telecommunication Arts and Technology
 Will Bennett, Albany Academy
 Jalen Burgess, Elmont Memorial
 Stafford Trueheart, Canisius

Sportsmanship Award 

 Travis Robinson-Morgan, Elmont Memorial

Class B 

Participating teams, results and individual honors in Class B were as follows:

Participating teams

Results 

Collegiate finished the season with a 26-5 record. The title was Collegiate's sixth, tied for second-most in state history.

Individual honors 

The following players were awarded individual honors for their performances at the Federation Tournament:

Most Valuable Player 

 Everett Witt, Collegiate

All-Tournament Team 

 Jason Cam, Collegiate
 Davis Franks, Collegiate
 Elijah Ramadhan, Olean
 Xavier Tellez, Salesian
 Jason Valera Munoz, KIPP NYC

Sportsmanship Award 

 Ben Eckstrom, Olean

External links 

 http://www.nysbasketballbrackets.com/

References

High school basketball competitions in the United States
High school sports in New York (state)
Sports competitions in Albany, New York
Basketball competitions in New York (state)
High
New York
New York state high school boys basketball championship